The Salon of Colombian Artists is a cultural event in Colombia, considered the event with most trajectory. This event is celebrated every year between August 5 and September 12 with two main categories a national event and a set of regional contests.

The first version of the Salon of Colombian Artists was set up during the presidency of Enrique Olaya Herrera whose administration tried to organize an official gallery. In 1931 the first official Salon of Colombian Artists took place in the Fine Arts Pavilion at the Independence Park in Bogotá. Ricardo Gómez Campuzano obtained the first place in painting and Luis Alberto Acuña in sculpture. Only until 1940 the first annual Salon of Colombian Artists was organized.

Winners 

Winners 1940 - 2002

1940 first Prize: Ignacio Gomez Jaramillo with "Madre del pintor", gold medal:Santiago Martínez Delgado with "El que volvio"
1941 first Prize: Santiago Martínez Delgado, with "Interludio", gold medal:Débora Arango
1942 first Prize: Carlos Correa, with "La Anunciación" Sculpture: José Domingo Domínguez with "Angustia"
  
1943  Suspended
 
1944 First Prize: Miguel Sopó Duque, with "Maternidad", in sculpture
Miguel Diaz Vargas, with "Estudio en gris", in painting

1945 First prize: Jorge Ruíz Linares, with "Retrato de Eduardo Mendoza"
1946 First prize: Josefina Albarracín, with Sculpture "Cabeza de muchacha" and First prize:  Carlos Díaz Vendaval,
1950 First prize: Moisés Vargas, with Sculpture "Laureano Gómez", Luis Alberto Acuña, with El Bautizo de Aquimín
1952 Tito Lombana,  San Sebastián  Escultura
Blanca Sinesterra de Carreño Delfinius (primavera)  Pintura

1957  Enrique Grau  Elementos bajo un eclipse  Pintura  Hugo Martínez  Forma mística  Escultura
1958 Fernando Botero  La Camara Degli Sposi  Pintura
1959 Eduardo Ramírez Villamizar  Horizontal blanco y negro  Pintura
1961 Ignacio Gomez Jaramillo  3 Dibujos  Dibujo
Pedro Luis Hanné Gallo  Niña pintora  Grabado  
Manuel Hernández Flores en blanco y rojo  Pintura

1962  Alejandro Obregón, Violencia
Eduardo Ramírez Villamizar, Relieve circular  Escultura    
 
1963 Pedro Alcántara Herrán, Naturaleza muerta # 1, 2, 3  Dibujo Beatriz Daza, Crisol para Prometeo  Escultura
Carlos Granada, Solo con su muerte  Pintura  
Edgar Negret, celeste  Escultura  
Augusto Rendón,  Santa Bárbara  Grabado

1964  Leonel Góngora, El gran inquisidor  Dibujo
Eduardo Ramírez Villamizar  Saludo al astronauta  Escultura  
Augusto Rivera  Paisaje y carroña  Pintura

1965  Pedro Alcántara Herrán  De esta tumba, de estas benditas cenizas no nacerán violetas  Dibujo
Feliza Bursztyn Mirando al norte  Escultura  
Normam Mejía, La horrible mujer castigada  Pintura

1966  Pedro Alcántara Herrán  Testimonio # 1, 2, 3  Dibujo
Roxana Mejía, Ziruma  Cerámica  
Alejandro Obregón,  Ícaro y las avispas  Pintura  
Eduardo Ramírez Villamizar,  El río  Escultura  
Augusto Rendón,  Un homenaje  Grabado

1967  Edgar Negret, Cabo Kennedy  Escultura
1969  Carlos Rojas  Ingeniería de la visión  Pintura
1970  Omar Rayo  Butatán  Pintura
1971  Olga de Amaral  Muro tejido # 79  Textil
1972  Suspended
1973  Ever Astudillo  Dibujo # 10 - # 11  Dibujo
Juan Antonio Roda  El delirio de las monjas muertas  Pintura  
Carlos Rojas  Espacios  Escultura

1974 Juan Cárdenas  Autorretrato  Dibujo
John Castles Modulación vertical  Escultura  
María de la Paz Jaramillo  La señora Macbeth  Grabado

1976  Germán Botero  Torre de metal  Escultura
Santiago Cárdenas  La corbata  Pintura  
Fernell Franco  Interior 1 - Interior 2  Fotografía

1978  Ana Mercedes Hoyos  Atmósfera  Pintura
Grupo  El sindicato  Alacena con zapatos  Escultura

1980  María Consuelo García  Juego # 1  Escultura
Beatriz Jaramillo  Zócalo  Audiovisual

1985  Carlos Salazar  La carta ( Betsabé )  Pintura
Ronny Vayda  Sin título  Escultura

1986 Leonel Góngora  Maternidad, Magadalena  Pintura
Víctor Laignelet  Trilogía de los espejos  Pintura   
Ángel Loochkarh  El Ángel nos llama  Pintura   
Miguel Ángel Rojas  Las partes I - Las partes II  Pintura   
Alicia Viteri  Tiempo gris  Pintura   
Gustavo Zalamea  Pera amarilla, estudio con frutas  Pintura

1987  Luis Fernando Peláez  Sin título  Escultura  Aeropuerto Olaya Herrera,  Medellín
Doris Salcedo  Sin título  Instalación

1989 Diego Mazuera  Desayuno en las rocas  Pintura
Miguel Ángel Rojas  Felicidad perdida  Fotografía  
Bibiana Vélez  Dificultad inicial  Pintura  
Hugo Zapata  Geografía  Escultura

1990 Rafael Echeverri  Sin título  Pintura
Consuelo Gómez  Guatavita  Escultura    
María Teresa Hincapié  Una cosa es una cosa  Performance  
Alberto Sojo  Sin título  Pintura

1992  Catalina Mejía  Sin título  Pintura
Nadín Ospina  In - Partibus Infidelium  Instalación  
Enrique Vargas  El hilo de Ariadna  Performance

1994  Fernando Arias  Cuarto frío  Instalación
José Horacio Martínez  La Naturaleza no da saltos  Pintura   
Alfonzo Suárez Ciodaro  Visitas y apariciones  Performance

1996 María Teresa Hincapié  Divina proporción  Performance
Mario Opazo Ícaro González, de la serie de Los ausentes  Instalación  
Luis Fernando Roldán  Calendario  Pintura

1998 Wilson Díaz Fallas de origen  Instalación
Alejandro Ortiz  Sin título  Instalación  
Grupo Nómada Rastros al vacío  Performance

2000   Proyecto Pentágono  PROYECTO PARALE
2002  38 Juan José Rendón  Movimiento interior Videoinstalación

References

External links
 50años SNA 50 years of National Salon of Colombian Artists
 Colombian Ministry of Culture -  National Salon of Colombian Artists
 Colombian Ministry of Culture - Salon of Colombian Artists
 National Salon of Artists

Arts awards in Colombia